Pablo Jarillo-Herrero (born June 11, 1976, in Valencia) is a Spanish physicist and current Cecil and Ida Green Professor of Physics 

at Massachusetts Institute of Technology (MIT).

Biography 
Jarillo-Herrero received in 1999 his Licenciatura in physics from the University of Valencia in Spain. Then he was two years at the University of California, San Diego, where he received a MSc in 2001. In 2005 at the Delft University of Technology in The Netherlands he earned his PhD, and continued on to a postdoc. In 2006 he moved to Columbia University, where he worked as a NanoResearch Initiative Fellow. In January 2008 he joined MIT as an assistant professor of physics and received tenure. In 2018 he was promoted to Full Professor of Physics.

In 2018 Jarillo-Herrero presented a new 2D-platform to investigate strongly correlated physics, based on graphene moiré superlattices. When two graphene sheets are twisted by an angle close to a magic angle theoretically predicted by Allan MacDonald and Rafi Bistritzer, the resulting flat band structure near the Dirac point gives rise to a strongly-correlated electronic system. His research demonstrated electrically tunable superconductivity in this system of pure carbon and without an applied magnetic field.

Honors 
 Elected Foreign Member of the US National Academy of Sciences (2022)
 Hanna Visiting Professor, Stanford University (2022)
 Ford Lecturer, University of Michigan Ann Arbor (2022)
 Pimentel Leturer, University of California Berkeley (2021)
 Highly Cited Researcher by Clarivate Analytics-Web of Science (2017–2022)
 Fellow of the Quantum Materials Program of the Canadian Institute for Advanced Research (2019)
 Member at Large of the APS Division of Condensed Matter Physics (2019)
 APS Fellow (2018)

Prizes and awards 
 2022 Dan Maydan Prize in Nanoscience Research, Israel 
 2021 Max Planck Humboldt Research Award, Germany 
 2021 NIMS Award, National Institute for Materials Science, Japan 
2021 US National Academy of Sciences Award for Scientific Discovery
2021 Lise Meitner Distinguished Lecture and Medal, Lise Meitner Distinguished Lecture
2020 Medal of the Spanish Royal Physics Society
2020 Wolf Prize in Physics
2020 APS Oliver E. Buckley Condensed Matter Physics Prize
2020 Moore Foundation Investigator in Quantum Materials Award 
2018 Breakthrough of the Year Award winner by Physics World
2014 Moore Foundation Investigator in Quantum Materials Award
2013 ONR Young Investigator Award
2012 Presidential Early Career Award for Scientists and Engineers (PECASE)
2011 DOE Early Career Award 
2010 IUPAP Young Scientist Prize in Semiconductor Physics
2009 David and Lucile Packard Fellowship
2008 Alfred P. Sloan Fellowship 
2008 NSF Career Award 
2006 Spanish Royal Society Young Investigator Award (2006)

Works

External links 
 Jarillo-Herrero Group am MIT

References 

1976 births
Living people
People from Valencia
Spanish physicists
University of Valencia alumni
Delft University of Technology alumni
Massachusetts Institute of Technology School of Science faculty
Wolf Prize in Physics laureates
Oliver E. Buckley Condensed Matter Prize winners
Fellows of the American Physical Society
Members of the United States National Academy of Sciences